Sundays with Anil and Karky is a 2017 Tamil-language musical reality talk show that aired on Zee Tamil HD from 31 December 2017 to 1 April 2018 on every Sunday at 12:00PM (IST) for 13 Episodes. The show is hosted by Tamil lyricist Madhan Karky and classical pianist Anil Srinivasan.

Synopsis
The show presents musical artists being interviewed, composing songs and performing them.

List of Episodes

References

External links
 Sundays with Anil and Karky on ZEE5

Zee Tamil original programming
Tamil-language reality television series
Tamil-language talk shows
Tamil-language musical television series
2017 Tamil-language television series debuts
Tamil-language television shows
2018 Tamil-language television series endings
Television shows set in Tamil Nadu